Un giorno da leoni (internationally released as A Day for Lionhearts) is a 1961 Italian war - drama film directed by Nanni Loy. The film describes the gradual evolution towards anti-fascism of Italian people during the Second World War.

Cast 
Renato Salvatori: Orlando
Tomas Milian: Gino Migliacci
Nino Castelnuovo: Danilo
Romolo Valli: Edoardo
Leopoldo Trieste: Michele 
Carla Gravina: Mariuccia 
Anna Maria Ferrero:  Ida 
Valeria Moriconi:  Orlando's wife
Saro Urzì: the sergeant
Corrado Pani: Mortati
Carlo D'Angelo: the priest
Tino Bianchi: the father of Danilo
Gigi Ballista: the friar
Enzo Turco:  Commissioner of Police
Regina Bianchi:  Edoardo's wife
Rina Franchetti:  the plebeian

References

External links

1961 films
1960s war drama films
Italian war drama films
Films directed by Nanni Loy
Films scored by Carlo Rustichelli
Films set in Rome
Films set in 1943
Films about Italian resistance movement
Italian Campaign of World War II films
1961 drama films
Italian World War II films
1960s Italian-language films
1960s Italian films